The Statute Law Revision Act 1964 (c 79) was an Act of the Parliament of the United Kingdom.

This Act was repealed by section 1 of, and Part XI of the Schedule to, the Statute Law (Repeals) Act 1974.

The enactments which were repealed (whether for the whole or any part of the United Kingdom) by this Act were repealed so far as they extended to the Isle of Man on 25 July 1991.

Section 2 - Saving for powers of the Parliament of Northern Ireland
This section was repealed by section 41(1) of, and Part I of Schedule 6 to, the Northern Ireland Constitution Act 1973.

See also
Statute Law Revision Act

References
Halsbury's Statutes,
John Burke (General editor). Current Law Statutes Annotated 1964. Sweet & Maxwell, Stevens & Sons. London. W Green & Son. Edinburgh. 1964.
The Public General Acts and Church Assembly Measures 1964. HMSO. London. 1965. Volume II. Page 1221.
HL Deb vol 258, cols 379 to 381.

United Kingdom Acts of Parliament 1964